Hanley was a borough constituency in Staffordshire which returned one Member of Parliament (MP)  to the House of Commons of the Parliament of the United Kingdom between 1885 and 1950. Elections were held using the first past the post voting system.

History 
The constituency was created for the 1885 general election. Before this, since 1832 a parliamentary borough of Stoke-upon-Trent had existed, covering almost the whole of what is now the Stoke-on-Trent conurbation and electing two MPs. In 1885, this was  split into two constituencies electing a single member each, Stoke-upon-Trent in the south and Hanley in the north. Hanley became a parliamentary borough in its own right, and shortly afterwards also became a county borough.

The Hanley constituency in the 1885 to 1918 period included Burslem, as well as Hanley itself, and was one of the most populous urban constituencies in the country, with more than 100,000 inhabitants by the time of the First World War. Its main economic base was pottery, though both towns included substantial numbers of coal miners as well as pottery workers. Predominantly working class, it could be normally be considered a safe Liberal seat; however, the Conservatives managed a narrow victory as part of their national landslide in 1900, perhaps helped by lack of enthusiasm among the potters for the Liberal candidate, Enoch Edwards, who was one of the leaders of the miners' union. Edwards convincingly recaptured the seat in 1906, and with the rest of his union joined the Labour Party in 1909. At the by-election after his death, however, the Liberals regained the seat, with the Labour candidate a poor third.

By the time of the general election of 1918, the county borough of Hanley had been absorbed into an enlarged county borough of Stoke-on-Trent, and in the boundary changes implemented in that year the same process took place at parliamentary level. The new parliamentary borough of Stoke-on-Trent was accorded three seats in place of the two which the area had had since 1885, and was divided into three single-member constituencies, of which Stoke-on-Trent, Hanley was one. The new division was smaller than the old constituency, Burslem now having a seat of its own, and quickly became a safe Labour seat, though the Conservatives won it in their landslide year of 1931.

Hanley was abolished for the 1950 general election, being largely replaced by the new Stoke-on-Trent Central constituency.

Boundaries
1885–1918: The municipal boroughs of Hanley and Burslem, and so much of the parliamentary borough of Stoke-upon-Trent as lay to the north of Hanley, and was not included in the local government district of Tunstall.

1918-1950: The County Borough of Stoke-on-Trent wards numbers nine, ten, eleven, twelve, thirteen, fourteen, fifteen, and sixteen.

Members of Parliament

Elections

Elections in the 1880s

Elections in the 1890s

Elections in the 1900s

Elections in the 1910s

A General Election was due to take place by the end of 1915. By the autumn of 1914, the following candidates had been adopted to contest that election. Due to the outbreak of war, the election never took place.
Liberal Party: R. L. Outhwaite
Labour Party: Myles Parker
Unionist Party: George Herman Rittner

Elections in the 1920s

Elections in the 1930s 

General Election 1939–40

Another General Election was required to take place before the end of 1940. The political parties had been making preparations for an election to take place and by the Autumn of 1939, the following candidates had been selected; 
Labour: Barnett Stross
Liberal National: Frederick L Boult

Elections in the 1940s

References 

 The Constitutional Year Book for 1913 (London: National Union of Conservative and Unionist Associations, 1913)
 Michael Kinnear, The British Voter (London: BH Batsford, Ltd, 1968)
 Henry Pelling, Social Geography of British Elections 1885-1910 (London: Macmillan, 1967)
 Frederic A Youngs, jr, Guide to the Local Administrative Units of England, Vol II (London: Royal Historical Society, 1991)

Parliamentary constituencies in Stoke-on-Trent (historic)
Constituencies of the Parliament of the United Kingdom established in 1885
Constituencies of the Parliament of the United Kingdom disestablished in 1950